Stará Voda is a village and municipality in the Gelnica District in the Košice Region of eastern Slovakia. Total municipality population was in 2011 224 inhabitants. It belonged to a German language island. The German population was expelled in 1945.

References

External links
http://en.e-obce.sk/obec/staravoda/stara-voda.html
Official homepage

Villages and municipalities in Gelnica District